Young Guitar Magazine is a Japanese guitar magazine first published in May 1969 by Shinko Ongaku Shuppansha (now Shinko Music Entertainment), with a focus on folk music. Starting from the 1970s, it started covering hard rock in the 1970s, and in the 1980s it leaned more towards guitar virtuosos, featuring acts from the heavy metal music and progressive rock genres. The magazine's lead editor was particularly impressed by Van Halen's debut album from 1978, and took that as a sign that bands like it would be the next sensation in rock music.

References

External links
 Young Guitar website in the Japanese language

1969 establishments in Japan
Folk music magazines
Heavy metal publications
Guitar magazines
Magazines published in Japan
Magazines established in 1969